Michael E. Lamb is a professor and former Head of the then Department of Social and Developmental Psychology at the University of Cambridge. In 2003 Lamb was the recipient of the 2003–2004 James McKeen Cattell Fellow Award from the Association for Psychological Science.

Education
Lamb graduated in 1972 with a B.A. degree from the University of Natal. He subsequently obtained a master's degree at Johns Hopkins University followed by a PhD in 1976 from Yale University. He wrote his dissertation on The relationships between infants and their mothers and fathers.

Professional research
Lamb researches early family relationships, child care, developmental science and related public policy. This work has focused on divorce, child custody, child maltreatment, and the effects of child care on children's sociological emotional development. His work in family relationships has focused on the role of fathers and the importance of their relationships with children. This includes traditional and non-traditional families, single fathers, families in economic struggle, and those at risk regarding domestic violence. He has researched how custody arrangements affect paternal relationships with children and the benefit of shared parenting after divorce. Lamb has conducted forensic interviews with children about child abuse and has developed best practices in regards to interviewing children about abuse. He has also researched and written about child care quality.

Lamb was the head of the section on social and emotional development of the National Institute of Child Health and Human Development in Washington DC for seventeen years. Lamb has published approximately 500 articles, many about child adjustment, has edited 40 books in developmental psychology, reviews about 100 articles a year and serves on editorial boards on several academic journals. He was awarded an honorary doctorate by Abertay University in Dundee in 2015.

Same-sex marriage: Proposition 8 in California
In 2010 Michael Lamb was to testify in the Perry v. Schwarzenegger trial which challenged the constitutionality of California Proposition 8 against same-sex marriage. Lamb testified that children do not require a male and a female parent to have a stable and healthy life growing up. Lamb stressed that childhood adjustment relied more on the relationships between the parents and the relationships the child has with their parents. While under question by lawyer David H. Thompson, who worked for the Proposition 8 campaign, Lamb had to admit that he was a member of the ACLU, the National Organization for Women, the NAACP, Amnesty International and the Nature Conservancy. Thompson called Lamb a "committed liberal." According to the United States District Court for the Northern District of California as the education and experience of each expert show, plaintiffs' experts were amply qualified to offer opinion testimony on the subjects identified. Moreover, the experts' demeanor and responsiveness showed their comfort with the subjects of their expertise. For those reasons, the court finds that each of plaintiffs' proffered experts offered credible opinion testimony on the subjects identified.

According to trial court in Howard v. Arkansas case in 2004, of the eight expert witnesses testifying at trial, "[t]he most outstanding of the expert witnesses was Dr. Michael Lamb." The trial court explained: "Without a single note to refer to and without any hint of animus or bias, for or against any of the parties, Dr. Lamb succinctly provided full and complete responses to every single question put to him by all counsel and was very frank in responding to inquiries from the court. Of all of the trials in which the court has participated, whether as a member of the bench or of the bar, Dr. Lamb may have been the best example of what an expert witness is supposed to do in a trial, simply provide data to the trier of fact so that the trier of fact can make an informed, impartial decision."

Shared parenting
Lamb has done extensive research on shared parenting after divorce. He has stated that hundreds of papers show a higher risk of maladjustment in children when parents have separated and that maintaining a relationship with both parents minimizes the risk and the bad effects of parental separation.

Selected publications

Books
Day, Randal D. & Michael E. Lamb. Conceptualizing and Measuring Father Involvement. London: Routledge (2003). 
Lamb, Michael E. & others. Tell Me What Happened: Structured Investigative Interviews of Child Victims and Witnesses. New York: Wiley (2008). 
Lamb, Michael E. The Role of the Father in Child Development. New York: Wiley (2010). 
Lamb, Michael E. & Debra A. Poole. Investigative Interviews of Children: A Guide for Helping Professionals. Washington, D.C.: American Psychological Association (1998).

Scientific articles
 Lamb ME. Does shared parenting by separated parents affect the adjustment of young children?. Journal of Child Custody. 2018 Jan 2;15(1):16-25. 
 Braver SL, Lamb ME. Shared parenting after parental separation: The views of 12 experts. Journal of Divorce & Remarriage. 2018 Jul 4;59(5):372-87.

Popular press
Lamb has contributed to Psychology Today.

External links
 Michael E. Lamb, Google scholar

References 

Living people
1953 births
Fellows of Sidney Sussex College, Cambridge
British psychologists
Social psychologists
Developmental psychologists